The 1970 Intercontinental Cup was a football tie held over two legs in August and September 1970 between the winners of the 1969–70 European Cup, Feyenoord, and winners of the 1970 Copa Libertadores, Estudiantes de La Plata.

The first leg was held on 26 August 1970 at La Bombonera in Buenos Aires, and ended in a 2–2 draw, with goals from Juan Echecopar and Juan Ramón Verón for Estudiantes and Willem van Hanegem and Ove Kindvall for Feyenoord. The return leg was held on 9 September 1970 at De Kuip in Rotterdam, which Feyenoord won 1–0 through a goal by Joop van Daele.

This was the first Intercontinental Cup title for Feyenoord in their first final appearance. Feyenoord never reached the Intercontinental Cup final again before the competition was made defunct in 2004 and merged into today's FIFA Club World Cup. On the other hand, this was the third consecutive final appearance for Estudiantes, having won in 1968 and lost in 1969.

Qualified teams

Venues

Match details

First leg 

|valign="top" width="50%"|

|}

Second leg 

|valign="top" width="50%"|

|}

See also
1969–70 European Cup
1970 Copa Libertadores

References

 

1970–71 in European football
1970 in South American football
1970–71 in Dutch football
1970 in Argentine football
1970
Feyenoord matches
i
International club association football competitions hosted by the Netherlands
International club association football competitions hosted by Argentina
Football in Buenos Aires
August 1970 sports events in Europe
September 1970 sports events in South America
1970
Sports competitions in Rotterdam
20th century in Rotterdam
1970s in Buenos Aires
September 1970 sports events in Europe
August 1970 sports events in South America